Rock Me may refer to:

Albums 
 Rock Me (Great White album), a 1997 compilation album, or the 1987 title song (see below)
 Rock Me: The Best of Great White, a 2006 compilation album
 Rock Me (Platnum album), 2005, or the title song
Rock Me, a Japanese-language album by Hound Dog (band)

Fashion 
 Rock Me! a 2009 fragrance by fashion designer Anna Sui

Songs 
 "Rock Me" (Rosetta Tharpe song), 1938
 "Rock Me" (Steppenwolf song), 1969
 "Rock Me" (ABBA song), 1976
 "Rock Me" (Great White song), 1987
 "Rock Me" (Riva song), 1989
 "Rock Me" (Melanie C song), 2011
 "Rock Me" (One Direction song), 2012
 "Rock Me", a song by Muddy Waters based on the same song as B.B. King's "Rock Me Baby"
 "Rock Me (In the Cradle of Love)", a song by Deborah Allen from Delta Dreamland